Rashida Yousuf (sometimes Yoosuf or Yusuf; her first name is sometimes transliterated Raashida) is a Maldivian politician and diplomat.

Yousuf first served in the cabinet of the Maldives as the Minister of Youth and Sports. Appointed Minister of Women's Affairs and Social Welfare in 1997, she remained in the position until 2002. In that year she attempted to open up discussion in the Maldives on the subject of domestic violence, but was unsuccessful. In the same year she was appointed High Commissioner of the Maldives to Sri Lanka, becoming the first woman to reach such a high rank in the Maldivian diplomatic corps. Yousuf was reappointed to the cabinet in 2008 by Maumoon Abdul Gayoom, a move that was not without controversy and which was described in some circles as nepotism. In 2011 she became Dhivehi Dhaulathuge Minister, holding that position until 2013. She is a member of the Progressive Party of Maldives. In 2008 she received an award from the Maldivian government for her work in the field of women's issues over the previous quarter-century.

References

Year of birth missing (living people)
Living people
Government ministers of the Maldives
Maldivian women diplomats
High Commissioners of the Maldives to Sri Lanka
Progressive Party of Maldives politicians
Women ambassadors
20th-century women politicians
21st-century diplomats
Women government ministers of the Maldives
Women's ministers
21st-century Maldivian women politicians
21st-century Maldivian politicians
20th-century Maldivian women